Mangelia cesta is a species of sea snail, a marine gastropod mollusk in the family Mangeliidae.

Description
The length of the shell attains 7 mm, its diameter 3 mm.

(Original description) The small shell is whitish, polished, with (on the body whorl six or seven) widely spaced narrow brown spiral lines. It contains six whorls without the (lost) protoconch. The suture is distinct. The axial sculpture consists of ten rounded ribs extending across the whorl with subequal or wider interspaces. The ribs are not shouldered and start from the suture which they undulate. The spiral sculpture consists of incised lines in the interspaces between the ribs. The brown color is situated in these grooves of which there are six or more on the body whorl, rather widely spaced;. The aperture is simple. The anal sulcus is inconspicuous. The siphonal canal is very short and wide.

Distribution
This marine species occurs off San Pedro, California, USA.

References

External links
  Tucker, J.K. 2004 Catalog of recent and fossil turrids (Mollusca: Gastropoda). Zootaxa 682:1–1295.
 

cesta
Gastropods described in 1919